Transformers: Armada, known in Japan as , is an anime series which debuted on August 23, 2002. As the first series co-produced between the American toy company Hasbro and their Japanese counterpart Takara, Armada begins a new continuity/universe for Transformers, with no ties to any of the previous series, including its direct predecessor Transformers: Robots in Disguise in 2001. It inspired two sequels, Transformers: Energon and Transformers: Cybertron.

Hasbro handled the production of the English dub of the series, which was outsourced over to SD Entertainment. Hasbro themselves handled North American rights, with Entertainment Rights securing international rights, while Takara handled the distribution of the Japanese license. Transformers: Armada and both of its following series are all part of a saga known as the "Unicron Trilogy".

Plot 

On the planet of Cybertron, war rages between the two factions known as the Autobots and the Decepticons over the race of smaller, power-enhancing Transformers called Mini-Cons. Seeking to flee the conflict that surrounds them, the Mini-Cons escape Cybertron with the aid of the Autobots, but an attack by the Decepticons cripples the ship as it flees through a spacebridge. The ship materializes in the Solar System and impacts with the Moon, breaking in two. One portion of the ship stays embedded on the Moon, while the other plummets to the planet below. The Mini-Cons, all locked in pentagonal stasis panels, are scattered across the globe. The ship crashes to Earth and 4 million years pass.

When Bradley "Rad" White and Carlos Lopez investigate the caves outside their city, they accidentally uncover the wreckage of the Mini-Con ship and activate it, causing it to send a signal that alerts both the Autobots and Decepticons as to the Mini-Cons' presence on Earth. Megatron and Optimus Prime's forces teleport to Earth from Cybertron as a result. Rad, Carlos, and their friend Alexis Thi Dang befriend the Autobots, along with the Mini-Cons High Wire, Grindor, and Sureshock (known commonly as the Street Action Mini-Con Team in the toyline). The Transformers assume earthen alternate modes, and the hunt begins to locate the scattered Mini-Cons.

After a series of battles, each of the Transformers successfully acquires a partner Mini-Con. Smokescreen arrives to join the Autobots' team. Hologram-recordings in a sunken city reveal the existence of the mighty Mini-Con weapon, the Star Saber. The Decepticons possess one component of the weapon, and invade the Autobot base to steal the remaining two pieces, only for the Autobots to seize possession of the sword.

A mysterious mercenary named Scavenger arrives on Earth and sides with the Decepticons, urging them to locate the components of the Skyboom Shield, another Mini-Con weapon that can counter the power of the Star Saber. At the same time, an Autobot drifter named Sideways enters the fray, but soon reveals his true allegiance to the Decepticons after he betrays Hot Shot, allowing the Star Saber to fall into the Decepticons' hands.

Concurrently Scavenger reveals himself to be an undercover Autobot, and rejoins his fellows, soon followed by Blurr, the latest arrival from Cybertron. When the Decepticons complete the Skyboom Shield, a mighty battle ensues that ends with the Autobots gaining possession of the shield. The two weapons unleash a powerful energy flare, drawing the Decepticons, Thrust, a master tactician, and Tidal Wave, a large and powerful warrior, to Earth.

Meanwhile, Sideways surreptitiously stirs up trouble in the Decepticon camp by playing on their contradictions. While luring the Autobots' human allies into cyberspace in an attempt to capture their Mini-Cons, Sideways reveals that he serves a mysterious higher power. Thrust arrives and puts his tactical prowess into play, only for his schemes to be foiled by the arrival of the Autobot, Jetfire, whose power to combine with Optimus defeats Thrust's schemes.

Eventually, Sideways' deception is discovered and Megatron proceeds to destroy him with the Star Saber, only for Sideways to escape by reforming his body. Tidal Wave arrives on Earth, and the Autobots prove vastly outmatched. Rad, Carlos, and Alexis are alerted to the existence of the Requiem Blaster, the third Mini-Con weapon by Sideways, and locate Skyblast, one of its components. Skyblast sings an eerie harmony that summons the other two Mini-Cons from their stasis, and they form the Blaster, allowing Optimus to defeat Tidal Wave.

Both sides soon gain new members in Sideswipe, an eager new Autobot, and Wheeljack, a former Autobot who has joined the Decepticons, believing that Hot Shot betrayed him on Cybertron. Thrust formulates a new scheme that allows the Decepticons to steal the Requiem Blaster, which involves mortally wounding Smokescreen in the process, causing Red Alert to re-format him into the more powerful form of Hoist. Starscream is his patsy, leading the already-alienated Decepticon to turn on Megatron and side with the Autobots. Starscream forms a friendship with the kids, particularly Alexis, and allowing the Autobots access to the Decepticons' base.

A raid allows the Autobots to free the Mini-Cons, but Starscream is soon deceived by Thrust, who in the meantime is being manipulated by Sideways, into stealing the Skyboom Shield and Star Saber and rejoining the Decepticons. With all three Mini-Con weapons now in their possession, the Decepticons create the Hydra Cannon, a weapon that combines all their power, and plan to destroy Earth from orbit. Optimus uses his Matrix to absorb the blast, but sacrifices himself in the process.

The Decepticons head for Cybertron in their craft, and the Autobots, now with Hot Shot in command, hastily construct a craft named the Axalon to pursue them. The Mini-Cons, now unleashing their true powers, accompany them into space, immediately leading into a battle that sees them use their full power to resurrect Optimus.

A black hole transports a small number of Autobots and Decepticons to a barren world where they are ravaged by Nemesis Prime, a twisted clone of Optimus, and have their power and armor enhanced by the Mini-Cons and with Megatron renaming himself Galvatron. Subsequently, the Decepticons return to Cybertron and quickly overthrow most of the planet through the powers of the Mini-Con weapons. Hot Shot assaults the Decepticon base solo, resulting in the revelation of Thrust's treachery. Thrust escapes with the Skyboom Shield and Requiem Blaster, delivering them to Sideways, who uses them to awaken the great and terrible Unicron, an enemy whose coming the Mini-Cons had foretold.

Rad and his friends are sent drifting through time, where it is revealed that via this, they played a part in the development of the Mini-Cons and the Mini-Cons are also revealed to be the cells of Unicron. Galvatron refuses to believe in the threat of Unicron and Starscream forces him into a duel - a duel Starscream purposefully loses, sacrificing himself to prove to Galvatron the threat of Unicron exists. Sideways steals the Star Saber, fully awakening Unicron, as the Autobots and Decepticons unite into one armada to attack the colossal Transformer who had been disguised as Cybertron's moon. During the battle, Galvatron confronts Thrust over his betrayal and leaves him to perish after the latter inadvertently gets himself crushed in Unicron's shoulder.

While Unicron attacks Cybertron, Galvatron and Optimus enter Unicron's body, where Sideways reveals himself to be created by Unicron as an emissary to bring the Mini-Cons back under his master's control only to have Rad re-awaken their minds, allowing the Mini-Con weapons to free themselves, de-powering Unicron. With Sideways eliminated and the threat of Unicron apparently gone, Galvatron challenges Optimus to a final battle, only for the energy released by their conflict to reactivate Unicron. Upon realizing his mistake to continue their hatred, Galvatron decides to sacrifice himself to end the cycle of hate that allows Unicron to exist. With Galvatron's death, Unicron mysteriously disappears and peace returns to Cybertron. Despite justice being given to all Transformers, Optimus feels dishonored, stating that he doesn't deserve the Matrix anymore, and goes into exile.

Production and release

Development
Transformers: Armada was written and produced in Japan, with creative input from America (the Japanese originally envisioned the series as set in the G1 continuity, but this idea was discarded by Hasbro, who also mandated the inclusion of Unicron, who had not been in the original story treatment for the series). However, the show premiered on Cartoon Network's Toonami in America before its original Japanese counterpart had aired - the result of a demanding production schedule set by the network, which caused the series to be fast-tracked out of production. Consequently, Armada features a lot of unfinished animation (which would go on to be perfected for the completed Japanese episodes), and a hastily produced dub which features many errors in naming such as Sureshock being repeatedly called "Grindor" in multiple episodes, Hot Shot being called "Hot Rod", and Optimus's Mini-Con partner Sparkplug being called "Leader-1" (the same name as Megatron's Mini-Con), as well as transliteration and nonsensical dialogue which does not match the action onscreen.

Veteran Transformers voice actors Garry Chalk and David Kaye appear in the English dub of series as Optimus Prime and Megatron respectively. Chalk previously voiced the equivalent character Optimus Primal in Beast Wars: Transformers and Beast Machines: Transformers, while Kaye voiced a different version of Megatron in the same shows.

When Armada was released on DVD in Japan, each of the thirteen volumes came with a four-page mini-manga and an exclusive repainted Mini-Con figure. The manga, titled Tales of the Microns: Linkage, feature these repaints in an original story which served to fill in many of the blank spots and plot holes in the animated series.

Airing
Despite Transformers: Armada being made by a Japanese studio, it premiered first in the United States. The series premiered on Cartoon Network on August 23, 2002 at 4 P.M. with a 90-minute movie special, consisting of the first three episodes. Following its premiere, new episodes started coming out on August 30, airing every Friday at 6:30 P.M.

In the December issue of Japanese magazine Animage, it was announced that the anime would start airing in Japan on January 10, 2003 on TV Tokyo, with new episodes coming out every Friday at 6 P.M.

Home media
Entertainment Rights owned worldwide home video rights to the series.

North America
In 2003, Entertainment Rights signed a North American home video deal with Rhino Entertainment Company to release the series on DVD in North America. These sets are now discontinued and out-of-print.

In August 2013, it was announced that Shout! Factory had partnered with Hasbro Studios to release numerous Transformers series in the United States, including Transformers: Armada.

International
In the United Kingdom, Right Entertainment and Universal Pictures Video released several VHS and DVD volumes of the series.

Related media

Video game

Developed by Atari Melbourne House and released for PlayStation 2 by Atari on May 11, 2004 in North America and May 7, 2004 in Europe, the Transformers video game (originally called Transformers Armada: Prelude to Energon, but simply titled again as Transformers.) is loosely based on the Armada series. In the game you play as three Autobots: Optimus Prime, Hot Shot, and Red Alert. The general story is the same as the TV show, you must find and collect the Mini-Cons and fight off Megatron and his Decepticons. In the game, you travel through various large environments on Earth (such as the Amazon Jungle and Antarctica) while fighting off Megatron's "Decepticlone" army and finding Mini-Cons that give the player's character different abilities in order to get further into the game. The player will also fight a number of familiar Decepticons from the Armada show, such as Starscream, Cyclonus, and Tidal Wave. The plot is similar to Armada, right down to the final battle with Unicron at the end. A few of the voice actors from the show (notably Garry Chalk as Prime and David Kaye as Megatron) voiced for the game. There are also subtle references to The Transformers: The Movie. The game is rated T on the ESRB ratings scale.

Merchandise
Built to Rule was a building blocks toyline from Hasbro that is compatible with such leading brands as Lego. Each Transformers kit is centered around a "Trans-Skeleton", a very simple humanoid body that folds up for vehicle mode without dis-assembly. From there, extra parts are added to the Trans-Skeleton for either mode. For Armada, the Trans-Skeleton was a very broad, flat solid plate with thin, stick-like limbs attached to it, which led to very awkward-looking robot modes.

Broadcasting

References

External links 

 Takara page
 
 Transformers (game) page on MobyGames

2000s American animated television series
2002 American television series debuts
2003 American television series endings
2003 anime television series debuts
2004 video games
American children's animated action television series
American children's animated space adventure television series
American children's animated science fantasy television series
American children's animated superhero television series
Japanese children's animated action television series
Japanese children's animated space adventure television series
Japanese children's animated science fantasy television series
Japanese children's animated superhero television series
Actas
Adventure anime and manga
Mecha anime and manga
Japanese television series based on American television series
Television shows set in the United States
Television series set in the 2010s
Toonami
Funimation
Armada
Armada
TV Tokyo original programming
Video games based on anime and manga
Video games developed in Australia